The Power of the Dog is a 2021 Western psychological drama film written and directed by Jane Campion, based on the 1967 novel of the same name by Thomas Savage. The film stars Benedict Cumberbatch, Kirsten Dunst, Jesse Plemons, and Kodi Smit-McPhee. The film deals with themes such as love, grief, resentment, jealousy and sexuality.

The film had its world premiere at the 78th Venice International Film Festival on September 2, 2021, where it received a four-minute standing ovation and Campion was awarded the Silver Lion for Best Direction. It also had Special Presentation screenings at the 2021 Toronto International Film Festival where it was second Runner-up for the People's Choice Award. The film had a limited theatrical release in Australia and New Zealand on November 11, 2021, and in the United Kingdom and in the United States on November 17; it was later released to stream worldwide on Netflix on December 1.

The Power of the Dog received universal critical acclaim for Campion's screenplay and direction, Greenwood's composing score, Wegner's cinematography, editing, visuals, and the performances of Cumberbatch, Smit-McPhee, Plemons and Dunst. It received a leading 12 nominations at the 94th Academy Awards, including Best Picture, Best Director for Campion, Best Actor for Cumberbatch, Best Supporting Actor for both Plemons and Smit-McPhee and Best Supporting Actress for Dunst, and was selected by the American Film Institute as one of its ten Movies of the Year.

The film garnered seven nominations at the 79th Golden Globe Awards including Best Actor – Motion Picture Drama and Best Supporting Actress – Motion Picture, winning Best Motion Picture – Drama, Best Director and Best Supporting Actor – Motion Picture for Smit-McPhee. It received three nominations at the 28th Screen Actors Guild Awards for Outstanding Performance by a Male Actor in a Leading Role, Outstanding Performance by a Male Actor in a Supporting Role and Outstanding Performance by a Female Actor in a Supporting Role. At the 75th British Academy Film Awards the film received eight nominations, including Best Film, Best Direction, Best Actor in a Leading Role, Best Actor in a Supporting Role and Best Adapted Screenplay, as well as ten nominations at the 27th Critics' Choice Awards, including Best Picture, Best Director, Best Actor, Best Supporting Actor, Best Supporting Actress and Best Adapted Screenplay. It became the first film directed by a woman to receive more than ten Academy Award nominations, and Campion became the first woman to receive more than one Academy Award nomination for Best Director, her first being for The Piano.

Accolades

References

External links
 

Lists of accolades by film
Netflix lists